Arhopala elopura, is a species of butterfly belonging to the lycaenid family described by Hamilton Herbert Druce in 1894. It is found in Southeast Asia (Borneo, Sumatra, Peninsular Malaya, Langkawi, Mergui, Myanmar, Thailand and Indochina).

Subspecies
Arhopala elopura elopura (Borneo, Sumatra, Peninsular Malaysia)
Arhopala elopura dama Swinhoe, [1911] (Langkawi, Mergui, Myanmar, Thailand, Indochina)

References

Arhopala
Butterflies described in 1894
Butterflies of Asia
Taxa named by Hamilton Herbert Druce